Hans Bauer may refer to:
 Hans Bauer (footballer) (1927–1997), German footballer
 Hans F. Bauer (1932–2009), American research chemist
 Hans Bauer (semitist) (1878–1937), German semitist
 Hans Bauer (cross-country skier) (1903–1992), German Olympic skier
 Hans Bauer (writer), Austrian (working in USA) screenwriter, author and photographer

See also 
 Hans Baur (1897–1993), Adolf Hitler's personal pilot